Deanna Smith (born 24 December 1980) is an Australian former professional basketball player. She is best known for her time spent in the Women's National Basketball League (WNBL), but has also spent time in England, Portugal, Russia and Italy. She has also played wheelchair basketball with the Women's National Wheelchair Basketball League (WNWBL). She was the first player to play in both the WNBL and WNWBL.

Career
Emerging with the Australian Institute of Sport (AIS) in the late 1990s, winning the 1999 Women's National Basketball League (WNBL) championship alongside the likes of Lauren Jackson and Penny Taylor, Smith came into her own at the Adelaide Lightning. It was in South Australia where she  thrived under the added responsibility, producing impressive seasons before making the move west to join the Perth Lynx in 2005. Here, Smith joined the WNBL elite, posting career-high numbers (21.7 ppg) and earning selection to the Australian Opals.

Smith got her first taste of overseas basketball in 2004 with the Manchester Mystics in the British League before returning to Europe in 2006, joining Portuguese team CAB Madeira – winning the league title in her first season. Smith returned to the WNBL and the Lynx in 2008, earning her second All-Star Five honour before repeating the dose in the 2009–10 season at the Sydney Uni Flames. However, injuries began to tether her career in later years, as she was sidelined for the entire 2010–11 campaign. She had another impressive season at the Bendigo Spirit in 2011–12, but injury again ravaged Smith in 2012–13 with the West Coast Waves, restricting her to just six games after setting the competition alight, winning the MVP at the 2012 WNBL Pre-Season Tournament. Having managed only half-a-dozen games in 2012–13 due to a foot fracture, Smith made just three appearances in 2013–14 before suffering a cartilage tear in her knee. She came back strong in 2014–15, averaging 11.8 points, 3.2 rebounds and 1.6 assists in 20 games for a dismal Waves team that won just four games during the season.

Smith has also played for multiple state league teams over her career. She won the Halls Medal for the best and fairest player in the Central ABL on two occasions; in 2003 and 2004 playing for South Adelaide. She has also played in the State Basketball League for the Perry Lakes Hawks and Cockburn Cougars, and in the South East Australian Basketball League (SEABL) for the Geelong Supercats.

In November 2016, Smith was appointed head coach of the Perry Lakes Hawks women's team for the 2017 SBL season. Four months later, she announced her retirement from playing basketball. Her coaching career could not have possibly started any better with the Lady Hawks winning the opening eight games of the season. Smith guided the Lady Hawks to the minor premiership with a 20–2 record before going on to guide them to the WSBL Grand Final, marking the team's first appearance in the championship decider since 2010 as they chased a first title since 2008. They went on to defeat the Mandurah Magic 59–48 in the grand final to win their seventh WSBL Championship. She parted ways with the Hawks in October 2021.

Wheelchair basketball

Smith played wheelchair basketball in the Women's National Wheelchair Basketball League (WNWBL) with the Be Active Western Stars in 2013, and the Red Dust Lady Heelers in 2017. Each WNWBL team is permitted to field a limited number of able-bodied players. She was the first player to play in both the WNBL and WNWBL.

Personal life
Smith's partner is Stephen Black, a former NBL and SBL star in his own right and the former head coach of the Willetton Tigers in the Men's SBL.

References

External links

WNBL player profile
Opals player profile
FIBA player profile

1980 births
Living people
Australian women's basketball players
Adelaide Lightning players
Bendigo Spirit players
Canberra Capitals players
Guards (basketball)
Sportspeople from Bendigo
Perth Lynx players
Sydney Uni Flames players